In southeastern Pennsylvania on April 4, 1991, a Piper Aerostar propeller-driven aircraft collided in mid-air with a Bell 412 helicopter over Merion Elementary School in Lower Merion Township, a suburb northwest of Philadelphia. All five people in both aircraft were killed, including United States Senator John Heinz, the sole passenger of the Piper. Two school children on the ground were also killed by falling debris. In addition to the seven total fatalities, five more people on the ground were injured.

An investigation discovered the cause of the accident to be poor judgment and pilot error of the crews from both aircraft.

Background
Heinz's Piper departed from Williamsport Regional Airport in central Pennsylvania at about 11:25 a.m. EST. Heinz was in Williamsport for a press conference pertaining to funding of U.S. Route 15. His press conference lasted about two and a half hours the morning of Thursday, April 4. Heinz rented the twin-engine Piper Aerostar from Lycoming Air, based at the Williamsport airport. Heinz and his two pilots, both from Lycoming County, departed for Philadelphia just before 11:30 a.m.

Crash
As Heinz's aircraft neared Philadelphia, on final approach to Philadelphia International Airport, pilot Richard Shreck noticed that the nose landing gear locked indicator was not illuminated. Shreck executed a missed approach and entered a holding pattern north of the airport. The two pilots began troubleshooting the problem and alerted air traffic control. They executed a low pass over the tower whose personnel all agreed the gear was extended. A passing Sun Oil Company Bell 412 helicopter, headed to the company's headquarters, was enlisted to identify if the gear was indeed down and locked.

The crew of the Bell 412 couldn't identify the condition of the landing gear from a safe distance so moved closer for a better look. At 12:10 p.m., the two aircraft collided over Merion Elementary in Lower Merion, with the helicopter's rotor clipping the left wing and fin of the Aerostar from underneath. The helicopter spun out of control and the Aerostar dived to the ground, disintegrating on impact in the elementary school grounds. All 5 people on board both aircraft were killed, including John Heinz. Two schoolgirls were killed and five others injured by the debris, which fell in a  radius around the school and surrounding area.

Investigation
An NTSB and FAA Investigation was opened almost immediately. In 1992, the National Transportation Safety Board's finding were announced. It was determined that the  "appallingly poor judgment" of both flight crews caused the accident.

The report later claimed that visual checks of the aircraft from the helicopter were pointless because it is impossible to see into the nose-wheel well of an Aerostar from a helicopter to check whether the nose-gear is locked.

The board's investigators recited a long litany of the mistakes and wrong decisions that led to the deaths and injuries. "This was a senseless accident that didn’t have to happen," said James L. Kolstad, chairman of the five-member National Transportation Safety Board at the time.

The official description of the accident as released by both the NTSB and FAA conclude that the incident was caused by poor judgment and pilot error of crews on the Aerostar and Bell helicopter. The helicopter crew's actions were pointless as the crew would have been unable to appropriately determine the condition of the nose-wheel of the Aerostar from a helicopter. And the Aerostar should have made an emergency landing attempt at Northeast Airport.

The accident caused a change in procedure at many airports as helicopters were not to be used to determine landing gear failure. Aircraft should just fly a low pass or buzz the airport for visual confirmation from services on the ground.

Aftermath

Reactions

News of Heinz's death at age 52 shocked fellow lawmakers. Senator Tim Wirth of Colorado, saying that he and his wife, Wren, considered Heinz and his wife, Teresa, "our dearest friends in the Senate," paid tribute to his "intense intelligence, sparkling charm, and broad vision."

 Senate Minority Leader Bob Dole of Kansas called Heinz "a dynamic and dedicated public servant, a tireless champion for Pennsylvania and a good and decent family man."
 Vice President Dan Quayle, in Los Angeles for a speech, said that "we are going to miss John Heinz tremendously. He made a tremendous contribution to the U.S. Senate."

Word of Heinz's death came from his Washington office. At midafternoon, sobbing members of his staff began walking out of his office in the Russell Senate Office Building. A few minutes later, the senator's legislative director, Richard Bryers, announced Heinz's death to reporters.

Media attention
The crash received multi-national attention making papers and news channels stories in the United Kingdom, France, Germany, Canada, and Australia.

No fly zone
A U.S. Army operation out of Fort Dix, New Jersey, was caught filming a commercial with aircraft near Merion Elementary shortly after the accident. Complaints followed. An informal ban on flights in Lower Merion during school hours lasted for a while. Even the media agreed not to fly traffic or news helicopters above the school.

References

External links
NTSB report

Aviation accidents and incidents in the United States in 1991
1991 in Pennsylvania
Accidents and incidents involving helicopters
April 1991 events in the United States
Aviation accidents and incidents caused by pilot error